R30 or R-30 may refer to:

Automobiles 
 Nissan Skyline (R30), a Japanese mid-size car
 Renault 30, a French executive car
 Renault R30, a Formula One racing car
 Toyota LiteAce (R30), a Japanese van
 Venucia R30, a Chinese hatchback

Roads 
 R30 road (Belgium)
 R30 (South Africa)

Other uses 
 R30 (New York City Subway car)
 Herero language
 , a destroyer of the Royal Navy
 R30: 30th Anniversary World Tour, a live DVD by the Canadian band Rush
 R30: Can become highly flammable in use, a risk phrase
 Renard R.30, a Belgian prototype airliner
 Roussel R-30, a French prototype fighter-bomber
 RSM-56 Bulava, a Russian submarine-launched ballistic missile
 Small nucleolar RNA R30/Z108
 ThinkPad R30, a ThinkPad R series laptop